The Bulgarian Athletica Federation (Bulgarian:  Българска федерация по лека атлетика) is the governing body for the sport of athletics in Bulgaria.

Affiliations 
World Athletics
European Athletic Association (EAA)
Bulgarian Olympic Committee

National records 
BFLA maintains the Bulgarian records in athletics.

External links 
Official webpage 

Bulgaria
Athletics
National governing bodies for athletics
1924 establishments in Bulgaria
Sports organizations established in 1924